"Mon cœur a trop aimé" is a song by Austrian singer, songwriter, and actress Zoë (full name Zoë Straub). The song was released as a digital download on 31 July 2015 through Global Rockstar Music. It has peaked at number 12 in Austria, becoming her best-charting single, and was written by Zoë and Christof Straub. The song was nominated for Song of the Year at the 2016 Amadeus Austrian Music Awards.

Music video
The song's official music video was released on 3 August 2015. It was directed by Stefan Tauber and Ramon Rigoni.

Track listing

Chart performance

Weekly charts

Release history

Covered by

References

2015 singles
2015 songs
Zoë Straub songs
French-language songs